Jacqui Mengler is an Australian sprint canoer who competed in the late 1990s. She won a bronze medal in the K-1 200 m event at the 1997 ICF Canoe Sprint World Championships in Dartmouth.

References

Australian female canoeists
Living people
Year of birth missing (living people)
ICF Canoe Sprint World Championships medalists in kayak